This is a list of American television-related events of 1979.

Events

Programs
ABC
American Bandstand (1952–1989)
The Edge of Night (1956–1984)
General Hospital (1963–present)
One Life to Live (1968–2012)
All My Children (1970–2011)
Monday Night Football (1970–present)
Schoolhouse Rock! (1973–1996)
Happy Days (1974–1984)
Barney Miller (1975–1982)
Good Morning America (1975–present)
Ryan's Hope (1975–1989)
Tom and Jerry (1965–1972, 1975–1977, 1980–1982)
Welcome Back, Kotter (1975–1979)
Charlie's Angels (1976–1981)
Family Feud (1976–1985, 1988–1995, 1999–present)
Laverne & Shirley (1976–1983)
What's Happening!! (1976–1979)
Eight Is Enough (1977–1981)
Fantasy Island (1977–1984)
The Love Boat (1977–1986)
Soap (1977–1981)
Three's Company (1977–1984)
20/20 (1978–present)
Mork & Mindy (1978–1982)
Taxi (1978–1983)
CBS
Love of Life (1951–1980)
Search for Tomorrow (1951–1986)
Guiding Light (1952–2009)
Face the Nation (1954–present)
Captain Kangaroo (1955–1984)
As the World Turns (1956–2010)
60 Minutes (1968–present)
Hawaii Five-O (1968–1980)
All in the Family (1971–1979)
Fat Albert and the Cosby Kids (1972–1984)
M*A*S*H (1972–1983)
The Price Is Right (1972–present)
The Waltons (1972–1981)
Barnaby Jones (1973–1980)
Match Game '79 (1962–1969, 1973–1984, 1990–1991, 1998–1999)
The Young and the Restless (1973–present)
Good Times (1974–1979)
The Jeffersons (1975–1985)
One Day at a Time (1975–1984)
Alice (1976–1985)
Wonder Woman (1976–1979)
The Amazing Spider-Man (1977–1979)
Lou Grant (1977–1982)
Dallas (1978–1991)
WKRP in Cincinnati (1978–1982)
NBC
Meet the Press (1947–present)
The Today Show (1952–present)
The Tonight Show Starring Johnny Carson (1962–1992)
The Doctors (1963–1982)
Another World (1964–1999)
Days of Our Lives (1965–present)
The Wonderful World of Disney (1969–1979)
The Tomorrow Show (1973–1982)
Dean Martin Celebrity Roast (1974–1984)
Little House on the Prairie (1974–1983)
The Rockford Files (1974–1980)
Saturday Night Live (1975–present)
Wheel of Fortune (1975–present)
Quincy, M.E. (1976–1983)
CHiPs (1977–1983)
Diff'rent Strokes (1978–1986)
PBS
Sesame Street (1969–present)
Masterpiece Theatre (1971–present)
Nova (1974–present)
In syndication
Candid Camera (1948–present)
Truth or Consequences (1950–1988)
The Lawrence Welk Show (1955–1982)
The Mike Douglas Show (1961–1981)
Hee Haw (1969–1992)
Soul Train (1971–2006)
Dinah! (1974–1980)
Match Game PM (1975–1981)
In Search of... (1976–1982)
The Gong Show (1976–1980)
The P.T.L. Club (1976–1987)
The Muppet Show (1976–1981)
This Week in Baseball (1977–1998, 2000–present)
Battle of the Planets (1978–1985)
HBO
Inside the NFL (1977–present)
Nickelodeon
Pinwheel (1977–1990)
America Goes Bananaz (1979–1980)
Video Comic Book (1979–1981)
Nickel Flicks (1979–1981)
Hocus Focus (1979–1980)

Debuting this year

Ending this year

Made-for-TV movies and miniseries

Television stations

Sign-ons

Network affiliation changes

Births

Deaths

See also
 1979 in the United States
 List of American films of 1979

References

External links 
List of 1979 American television series at IMDb